Willard Moon Smith (1840-March 26, 1918) was a sergeant serving in the United States Marine Corps during the American Civil War who received the Medal of Honor for his actions in the Battle of Mobile Bay.

Biography
Smith was born in 1840 in Allegany, New York, and entered the Marine Corps from Brooklyn, New York on August 18, 1862. He was a corporal assigned to the Marine Detachment aboard the USS Brooklyn when it was sent to fight in the American Civil War during the Battle of Mobile Bay.

He was discharged from the Marine Corps on August 19, 1866. He died on March 26, 1918, and is buried at Elmlawn Cemetery in Kenmore, New York.

Medal of Honor citation
Rank and organization: Corporal, U.S. Marine Corps. Born: 1840, Alleghany, N.Y. Accredited to: New York. G.O. No.: 45, 31 December 1864.

Citation:

On board the U.S.S. Brooklyn during action against rebel forts and gunboats, and with the ram Tennessee in Mobile Bay, 5 August 1864. Despite severe damage to his ship and the loss of several men on board as enemy fire continued to fall, Cpl. Smith fought his gun with skill and courage throughout the furious 2_hour battle which resulted in the surrender of the rebel ram Tennessee.

See also

List of American Civil War Medal of Honor recipients: Q–S

References

External links

1840 births
1918 deaths
United States Marine Corps Medal of Honor recipients
United States Marines
Union Marines
People of New York (state) in the American Civil War
Burials in New York (state)
American Civil War recipients of the Medal of Honor
People from Allegany, New York